This is a list of main career statistics of Croatian former professional tennis player Ivan Ljubičić. All statistics are according to the ATP World Tour and ITF website.

Significant finals

Olympics medal matches

Doubles: 1 (1 bronze medal)

ATP Masters Series tournaments

Singles: 4 (1 title, 3 runners-up)

Career finals

ATP career finals

Singles: 24 (10 titles, 14 runners-up)

Doubles: 4 (4 runners-up)

Performance timelines 

Current till 2012 Monte-Carlo Rolex Masters.

Singles

Record against top 10 players
Ljubičić's record against players who held a top 10 ranking, with those who reached No. 1 in bold

Singles 

 Arnaud Clément 10–2
 Mikhail Youzhny 8–1
 Mario Ančić 5–1
 Tommy Robredo 5–1
 Paradorn Srichaphan 5–2
 Thomas Johansson 5–3
 David Nalbandian 5–4
 Nicolas Kiefer 4–0
 Tim Henman 4–1
 James Blake 4–2
 Sébastien Grosjean 4–2
 Gaël Monfils 4–3
 Carlos Moyá 4–3
 Nikolay Davydenko 4–4
 Fernando González 4–4
 Andy Roddick 4–7
 Karol Kučera 3–0
 Fernando Verdasco 3–1
 Nicolás Almagro 3–2
 Tomáš Berdych 3–2
 Mardy Fish 3–2
 Yevgeny Kafelnikov 3–2
 Nicolás Lapentti 3–2
 Gilles Simon 3–2
 Robin Söderling 3–2
 Juan Carlos Ferrero 3–3
 Jo-Wilfried Tsonga 3–3
 Stan Wawrinka 3–3
 Andy Murray 3–4
 Rainer Schüttler 3–5
 Roger Federer 3–13
 Kei Nishikori 2–0
 Marin Čilić 2–1
 Joachim Johansson 2–1
 Nicolás Massú 2–1
 Juan Mónaco 2–1
 Andre Agassi 2–2
 Marat Safin 2–2
 Janko Tipsarević 2–2
 Guillermo Coria 2–3
 Gastón Gaudio 2–3
 Tommy Haas 2–3
 Marcos Baghdatis 2–4
 Gustavo Kuerten 2–5
 Novak Djokovic 2–7
 Rafael Nadal 2–7
 Ernests Gulbis 1–0
 Goran Ivanišević 1–0
 Todd Martin 1–0
 Andriy Medvedev 1–0
 Mark Philippoussis 1–0
 Cédric Pioline 1–0
 Greg Rusedski 1–0
 Albert Costa 1–1
 Juan Martín del Potro 1–1
 Thomas Enqvist 1–1
 Félix Mantilla 1–2
 Radek Štěpánek 1–2
 Magnus Norman 1–3
 Wayne Ferreira 1–4
 David Ferrer 1–6
 Jonas Björkman 0–1
 Lleyton Hewitt 0–1
 Richard Krajicek 0–1
 Magnus Larsson 0–1
 Guillermo Cañas 0–2
 Àlex Corretja 0–2
 Richard Gasquet 0–2
 Mariano Puerta 0–2
 Jiří Novák 0–3
 Marcelo Ríos 0–3
 Marc Rosset 0–3
 Jürgen Melzer 0–5

Wins per season

National participation

Team competitions finals: 2 (2 titles)

Davis Cup  (36–19) 

Source:

References

Ljubicic, Ivan